Sauermugg is a novel by Norwegian author Stig Sæterbakken. Originally published in 1999, it introduces Sæterbakken's alter-ego Sauermugg. The novel has since been released in different revised and expanded versions, such as the Swedish Sauermugg Redux-edition in 2007, with ca. 50 pages of additional material.

1999 novels
20th-century Norwegian novels
Novels by Stig Sæterbakken